Wingly is an international company based in Paris, France. Running an online flightsharing platform, they connect passengers and local private pilots. Private pilots can offer seats on their flights departing from local aerodromes. The website is part of the sharing economy. When offering a flight, the pilot shares the operational expenses with their passengers. 

This service is often compared to Uber, Airbnb or Blablacar. All flights are insured by Allianz.

Pilots are not allowed to make a profit, but they can split the direct costs of the flight equally with the passengers.

References

External links

Transport companies established in 2015
Ridesharing companies of France
Android (operating system) software
IOS software